The 2003 Pacific motorcycle Grand Prix was the thirteenth round of the 2003 MotoGP Championship. It took place on the weekend of 3–5 October 2003 at the Twin Ring Motegi circuit.

MotoGP classification

250 cc classification

125 cc classification

Championship standings after the race (motoGP)

Below are the standings for the top five riders and constructors after round thirteen has concluded.

Riders' Championship standings

Constructors' Championship standings

 Note: Only the top five positions are included for both sets of standings.

Notes

References

Pacific motorcycle Grand Prix
Pacific
Pacific Motorcycle Grand Prix